Matias Koski (born 18 May 1994) is a Finnish swimmer. At the 2012 Summer Olympics, he competed in the Men's 400 metre freestyle, finishing in 22nd place in the heats. He also competed in the Men's 200 metre freestyle, winning his heat, but finishing in 31st in the heats and the Men's 1500 metre freestyle, finishing in 26th place in the heats.
In his colliegate swimming, Matias won the Men's 1650 Freestyle at the NCAA Championship.

See also

 List of University of Georgia people

References

Finnish male freestyle swimmers
1994 births
Living people
Olympic swimmers of Finland
Swimmers at the 2012 Summer Olympics
Swimmers at the 2016 Summer Olympics
Georgia Bulldogs men's swimmers
People from Hämeenlinna
Sportspeople from Kanta-Häme